Raymond Stuart Stata (born 1934) is an American entrepreneur, engineer, and investor.

Early life and education
Stata was born on November 12, 1934 in the small farming community of Oxford, Pennsylvania to Rhoda Pearl Buchanan and Raymond Stanford Stata, a self-employed electrical contractor. In high school, Ray worked as an apprentice for his father. Ray's mother was a factory worker. Ray's sister, Joan Stata, was five years older and worked as a nurse in Wilmington, Delaware. In the first grade, Stata attended a one-room school with one teacher serving eight grades. His parents moved to the outskirts of Baltimore to work at an aircraft factory during WWII. Ray attended Oxford High School in Oxford, Pennsylvania. After high school, Stata earned Bachelor of Science and Master's degrees from Massachusetts Institute of Technology (MIT).

Stata married Maria in June, 1962. The two reside in the Boston area, where they raised their son Raymie (born 1968) and daughter Nicole. Raymie graduated from MIT and founded Stata Labs which was acquired by Yahoo! in 2004, and in 2010, was named Yahoo!'s CTO. Nicole is also an entrepreneur, having started Deploy Solutions, which she sold to Kronos in 2007. She later founded Boston Seed Capital, a seed venture capitalist firm.

Career 
In 1965, Ray founded Analog Devices, Inc. with MIT classmate Matthew Lorber in Cambridge, Massachusetts. Before founding Analog Devices, Stata and Lorber, together with Bill Linko, another MIT graduate, founded Solid State Instruments, a company which was acquired by Kollmorgen Corporation. In addition to Analog and Solid State Instruments, Stata is founder of Stata Venture Partners. They were early investors in Nexabit Networks, which in June 1999, was acquired by Lucent for $900M.

Stata is a member of the American Academy of Arts and Sciences and the National Academy of Engineering, and was the recipient of the 2003 IEEE Founders Medal.

Industry work 
Stata co-founded and served as the first President of the Massachusetts High Technology Council (MHTC) in 1977. With MHTC, Stata has advocated for engineering education and university research funding as a shared responsibility of government and industry. Stata led MHTC to push for state government policies to make Massachusetts the best state in which to live and work.

Stata also worked on the federal level, serving on the Executive Committee of the Council on Competitiveness from 1987–2005. Stata also served on the Malcolm Baldrige National Quality Award Board of Overseers, stemming from his professional commitment to total quality management.

He served on the board of the Semiconductor Industry Association from January 1, 1996 to November 7, 2013, and as the group's chairman in 2011. The group awarded Stata with the Robert N. Noyce Award, the industry's highest honor, in November, 2001.

Stata was actively engaged in the stewardship of MIT, his alma mater, in several roles. He served as the Chairman of the Visiting Committee of the Department of Electrical Engineering and Computer Science until 2010. In 1984, he was elected to MIT's Corporation and served as a member of its Executive Committee. From 1987–1988 he served as President of the MIT Alumni Association.

In 1997, Stata contributed $25M to the construction of a new academic complex on the MIT campus called the Ray and Maria Stata Center. The building was designed by Frank Gehry.

Ray and Maria are life trustees of the Boston Symphony Orchestra. In 1999, Ray and Maria Stata endowed the Music Director chair position.

Honors 
 1990: Elected to the American Academy of Arts and Sciences
 1992: Elected to the National Academy of Engineering
 1996: Named Foreign Fellow of Indian National Academy of Engineering
 2001: Recipient of the Semiconductor Industry Association's Robert M. Noyce Award for Leadership
 2003: Recipient of the IEEE Founders Medal
 2008: Recipient of EE Times "Lifetime Achievement" award
 2010: MIT Commencement Speaker

Publications 
 Co-author, Global Stakes, Ballinger Press, 1982
 Co-author, The Innovators, Harper & Rowe, 1984
 Published Article in MIT Sloan Management Review (1989), titled: "Organization Learning – The Key to Management Innovation"
 Published Article in CQM Journal (1995), titled: "A Conversation about Conversations"
 Published Article in Arthur D Little, titled: "Organizational Learning: The Key to Success in the 1990s"

References

External links 
 
 Ray Stata interview with McKinsey

1934 births
Living people
American business executives
American chief technology officers
Businesspeople from Pennsylvania
MIT School of Engineering alumni